The J. G. Brill Company manufactured streetcars, interurban coaches, motor buses, trolleybuses  and railroad cars in the United States for almost ninety years, making it the longest-lasting trolley and interurban manufacturer. At its height, Brill was the largest manufacturer of streetcars and interurban cars in the US and produced more streetcars, interurbans and gas-electric cars than any other manufacturer, building more than 45,000 streetcars alone.

The company was founded by John George Brill in 1868 in Philadelphia, as a horsecar manufacturing firm. Its factory complex was located in south-west Philadelphia at 62nd St and Woodland Avenue, adjacent to the Baltimore and Ohio Railroad tracks. Over the years, it absorbed numerous other manufacturers of trolleys and interurbans, such as Kuhlman in Cleveland and Jewett in Indiana. In 1944, with business diminishing, it merged with the American Car and Foundry Company (ACF) to become ACF-Brill. Although the company ceased production in 1954, some of its interurbans served the Philadelphia area until the 1980s.

History

Trolleys and interurban cars
In 1868, the Brill company was founded as J.G. Brill and Sons. After James Rawle joined the firm in 1872 it was renamed The J.G. Brill Company. In 1902, Brill bought out the American Car Company; in 1904, G. C. Kuhlman Car Company  (Cleveland), then the  John Stephenson Company  (New Jersey) ; and in 1907 Wason Manufacturing Company (Massachusetts). Brill acquired a controlling share of the Danville Car Company in 1908, dissolving it in 1911, then the Canadian railway car builder Preston Car Company in 1921, which ceased operating in 1923. With rapid internal growth plus these acquisitions, Brill became the largest rail car manufacturer in the world. As large orders continued to be won, new facilities continued to be added in Philadelphia, including steel forges and cavernous erecting shops. Brill's primary and very large plant was at 62nd and Woodland Ave., adjacent to the Baltimore and Ohio Railroad which it used for shipping its products.  One particularly large order, received in 1911, was for 1,500 streetcars for the Philadelphia Rapid Transit Company.  It took two years to build those trolleys, with delivery rates at times exceeding a hundred cars a month. All told, more than 30,000 rail vehicles were produced at the Brill plant. In its best years, a workforce of 3,000 Philadelphians was employed by Brill, with many being skilled laborers and craftsmen.

Gas electric motor cars
Heavy weight full railroad size gas electric cars capable of towing up to two trailers were manufactured using General Electric Company electrical equipment and various engine manufacturers for branch line service with little passenger demand to uphold U.S Post Office contracts requiring reduced crew sizes. The Pennsylvania Railroad was a large purchaser.

Buses
With the rapid growth of paved roads nationally and the explosion in auto use plus the impact of the great Depression, the business of trolley use thus trolley construction collapsed. Attempts by Brill to provide acceptable new designs went nowhere. The last rail cars built by J.G. Brill were 25 streamliner Brillliners for Atlantic City in 1939 and a final 10 trolley PCC competitive Brillliners for Philadelphia's Red Arrow Lines two years later. Production shifted to rubber-tired vehicles. More than 8,000 gasoline- and electric-powered buses (trolley buses) were built in the 1940s. However, by the early 1950s even the bus orders had dried up. In March 1954, the Brill plant was sold to the Penn Fruit Company and a strip mall was built on the eastern end of the site. In 1926, American Car and Foundry Company acquired a controlling interest in what had become the Brill Corporation. The new structure consisted of:
 ACF Motors Company, which owned Hall-Scott Motor Car Company (100%) and controlled 90% of Fageol Motors; and
 the J.G. Brill Company. In 1944, the two companies merged, forming the ACF-Brill Motors Company. In the same year, ACF-Brill licensed Canadian Car and Foundry of Montreal to manufacture and sell throughout Canada motor buses and trolley coaches of their design as Canadian Car-Brill. The firm built about 1,100 trolley buses and a few thousand buses under the name. Brill had earlier (in 1908) established a company in France (Cie. J.G. Brill of Gallardon, which was sold to Electroforge in 1935).

In 1946, Consolidated Vultee Aircraft Corporation acquired a controlling interest in ACF-Brill for $7.5 million. Consolidated Vultee was sold the following year to the Nashville Corporation, which in 1951 sold its share to investment firm Allen & Co. In early 1954, the Brill name disappeared when ACF-Brill ceased production and subcontracted its remaining orders. Brill granted licenses to build its vehicles to the Canadian Car and Foundry Company (Peter Witt streetcars, trolley buses and motor buses), and the South Australian Railways (Model 75 railcars).

Products

Birney safety car – by subsidiary, the American Car Company.
Traditional arch-windowed, all-wood interurban cars. 1890-1920s.
Model 55 (1924–38), Model 65 (1924) and Model 75 (1924–) railcars. Almost 300 were built for US and foreign railroads. A major purchaser was the South Australian Railways, which bought 12 Model 55 power cars plus trailers in 1924, followed in 1928 by 39 Model 75 power cars (all but the first being constructed in South Australia at the Islington Railway Workshops) plus trailers. The last was withdrawn from service in 1971.
Steel heavy interurban cars built 1920-1930s. The Brill "Center Door" car was typical of suburban trolleys and interurbans built around 1920. These tended to be large, heavy, double-ended cars, with passengers entering and exiting via doors located at the center of the car. Many were rebuilt into one-man cars.
Brill "Master Unit," built 1930s. All-steel; had standard controller stand, capable of 70 mph. [p86-100]
Brilliner – Brill's competitor to the PCC (Presidents' Conference Committee) car looked somewhat like the first PCCs. The Brilliner was not successful when compared to the PCC. Underpowered. Few were sold, whereas PCCs were well sold worldwide. Twenty-four built for Atlantic City's Miss America Fleet.
Brill "Bullet" car, 1929–1932. For suburban/interurban use.
Brill diners – Brill sold and designed diners, generally through one of its four subsidiaries, the Wason Manufacturing Company. The last one believed to be operating is the Capitol Diner in Lynn, Massachusetts, which is listed on the National Register of Historic Places. 
Peter Witt streetcar
Large cars with trailers
Small cars
Numerous models of trolleybuses, including T30, T40, 40SMT, 44SMT and, as ACF-Brill, TC44 and T46/TC46
C-36 city bus
IC-41 intercity bus

Bullet interurban cars

The lines that operated interurban passenger cars recognized in the mid-1920s that they needed faster, quieter, more power-efficient equipment. Until then, the wooden and most of the steel interurban cars were large, sat high, and were heavy. Streetcars were slow, noisy, and clumsy to operate using the motor controller "stand" of the time. Car manufacturers such as Cincinnati Car Company (who already in 1922 made a lightweight, albeit slow, interurban), St. Louis Car Company, Pullman, and Brill worked to design equipment for a better ride at high speed, improved passenger comfort, and reduced power consumption. This particularly involved designing low-level trucks (bogies) able to handle rough track at speed. Brill, in conjunction with Westinghouse and General Electric, worked on a new interurban design and on a new streetcar design (the PCC).

The interurban design result was the aluminum-and-steel, wind-tunnel-developed, slope-roof "Bullet" multiple-unit cars, the first of which were purchased in 1931 by the Philadelphia and Western Railroad, a third-rail line running from 69th Street Upper Darby to Norristown in the Philadelphia region. This line still runs as SEPTA's Norristown High Speed Line. They were very successful, and operated until the 1980s, but Brill sold few others. Only the central New York state interurban Fonda, Johnstown, and Gloversville Railroad ordered Bullets, albeit a single-ended, single-unit "trolley-ized" version. Five were procured in mid-Depression 1932 for passenger business that was rapidly declining. In 1936, the closing FJ&G sold these Bullets to the Bamberger Railroad in Utah, which ran them in high-speed service between Salt Lake City and Ogden until the mid-1950s.

Three of the SEPTA Bullet cars are now at the Seashore Trolley Museum; one is at the Electric City Trolley Museum in Scranton; one is at the Rockhill Trolley Museum in Orbisonia, Pennsylvania; one is at the National Museum of Transportation in St. Louis, Missouri; and one is at the Pennsylvania Trolley Museum in Washington, Pennsylvania. A Bamberger Bullet is in the Southern California Railway Museum in Perris, California, and another has been preserved by the Utah State Railroad Museum. A third is a part of a restaurant building in Springville, Utah, but is barely recognizable as a Bullet.

Brill also manufactured the Pack Howitzer 75 mm cannon for the U.S. Military during the years between World Wars I and II.

Brill look-alike cars in the 2010s
Since 2015 the JR Kyushu, one of the constituent companies of Japan Railways Group, has operated the Aru Ressha "sweet train", a deluxe excursion train. It comprises two power cars and two newly built trailer cars based on a luxury Brill car the railway ordered in 1908 but never used. Scale models of the original cars were used to derive the design.

See also
 Frankfort and Cincinnati Model 55 Rail Car
 List of tram builders

References

Bibliography
 Middleton, William D. The Interurban Era, Kalmbach Publishing Company, Milwaukee, 2000 [1965]. . (Coverage: list of US interurban car manufacturers, pp 416–417; Bullet design, pp 68–70.)
 Volkmer, William D. Pennsylvania Trolleys in Color, Morning Sun Books, Scotch Plains, 1998. Vol. 2. . (Coverage: photographs of Brilliners, Bullets and other Brill designs, on Philadelphia and Western line and in shops.)
 Hilton, George W. & Due, John F. The Electric Interurban Railways in America, Stanford University Press, Stanford, reissue 2000. . (Coverage: development of improved interurban car design.)
 Springirth, Kenneth C. Suburban Philadelphia Trolleys, Arcadia Publishing, Charleston, 2007. . (Coverage: development of Bullet design.)
 Bradford, Francis H. & Dias, Ric A. Hall-Scott: the untold story of a great American engine maker, SAE International Book Publishing, Warrendale, 2007. .

External links

History of J.G. Brill Company
 The J.G. Brill Company Records, including approximately 16,000 photographs, are available for research use at the Historical Society of Pennsylvania.
Brill Bullet
Photos of Red Arrow Trolleys, including Brill cars
Brill history and photos
The Tramways of Colombia

Defunct bus manufacturers of the United States
Defunct rolling stock manufacturers of the United States
Tram manufacturers
Trolleybus manufacturers
Manufacturing companies based in Philadelphia
Vehicle manufacturing companies established in 1868
Manufacturing companies disestablished in 1954
1868 establishments in Pennsylvania
1954 disestablishments in Pennsylvania
Electric vehicle manufacturers of the United States
Defunct manufacturing companies based in Pennsylvania